The Wilmington, Charlotte and Rutherford Railroad, originally the Wilmington and Charlotte Railroad, was a railway company in the United States. It was incorporated in 1855 and reorganized as the Carolina Central Railway in 1873. It built  of track, in two unconnected sections, in the southern part of North Carolina. The company was again reorganized as the Carolina Central Railroad in 1880. In 1900, the Carolina Central Railroad was merged into the Seaboard Air Line Railroad. Its lines are now owned by CSX Transportation.

History
The Wilmington and Charlotte Railroad was incorporated on February 13, 1855, but the name was changed soon after to the Wilmington, Charlotte and Rutherford Railroad. The company intended to build a railway line from Wilmington, North Carolina, on the Atlantic Ocean, to Rutherford County, North Carolina, via Charlotte, North Carolina.

The company completed a  line from Navassa, outside Wilmington, to Rockingham, in 1861. This line included a -long segment of straight track between Laurel Hill and East Arcadia, the longest such line in the United States. The outbreak of the American Civil War prevented any further construction from taking place. In 1870 an additional  opened between Rockingham and Pee Dee, on the Pee Dee River, leaving the a  gap between the two sections of the railroad.

The company entered receivership in 1872 and was sold in 1873 to the Carolina Central Railway, which in 1874 completed the connection between Wilmington and Charlotte. The railroad finally reached Rutherford via a new extension of the line in 1877. Another change in corporate identity occurred in 1880, when the Carolina Central Railway became the Carolina Central Railroad, controlled by a predecessor of the Seaboard Air Line Railroad. The Carolina Central Railroad was ultimately merged into the Seaboard Air Line Railroad in 1900. Today, the company's lines are part of the Charlotte Subdivision and Wilmington Subdivision of CSX Transportation.

References

Further reading
 
 
 

Defunct North Carolina railroads
Railway companies established in 1855
Railway companies disestablished in 1873
American companies established in 1855